Alessandro Beccaria (born 12 June 1988) is an Italian footballer who plays as a forward. He previously played for A.C. Sambonifacese in the Lega Pro Seconda Divisione.

References

External links
 

Living people
1988 births
Sportspeople from Mantua
Italian footballers
Footballers from Lombardy
Association football forwards
Indonesian Premier Division players
Serie C players
A.C. Sambonifacese players
Bali Devata F.C. players
Sportfreunde Lotte players
SV Wilhelmshaven players
Italian expatriate footballers
Italian expatriate sportspeople in Indonesia
Expatriate footballers in Indonesia
Italian expatriate sportspeople in Germany
Expatriate footballers in Germany